Kaediyeh (also Romanized as Kā’edīyeh and Kaidiyēh; also known as Qā‘edīyeh) is a village in Mollasani Rural District, in the Central District of Bavi County, Khuzestan Province, Iran. At the 2006 census, its population was 97, in 25 families.

References 

Populated places in Bavi County